The Balkans Cup is a rugby league football tournament for Balkan nations. It was first held in 2014, with Serbia, Greece, Hungary and Bosnia each playing against a random first round opponent, then the losing teams contesting the 3rd place match, and the winning teams battling it out in the Grand Final. Greece were crowned inaugural Balkans Cup winners. The Balkans Cup is contested biennially with four teams and the most recent one was held in 2017, with Bulgaria joining the competition. It is run by the Rugby League European Federation.

In June 2021 there was no Balkan Cup, but Serbia toured Bosnia, Bulgaria and Montenegro, winning all three games.

Results

See also

 List of international rugby league teams

References

 
Biennial sporting events
European rugby league competitions
Recurring sporting events established in 2014
Rugby league international tournaments